James Watts may refer to:

Politicians
 James Watts (British politician) (1903–1961), Conservative Member of Parliament for Manchester Moss Side 1959–1961
 James Watts (Mayor of Manchester) (died 1878), also High Sheriff of Lancashire and owner of Abney Hall

Others
 James Watts (rugby union) (1878–1933), Wales international rugby union player
 James W. Watts (1904–1994), American neurosurgeon and early pioneer of lobotomy
 KiloWatts (musician) (James Watts, born 1980), Philadelphia-based electronica producer and composer
 James Watts (cricketer) (1835–1919), English cricketer
 James Laurence Watts (1849–1925), sculptor in Queensland, Australia
 James Washington Watts (born 1960), American professor of religion

See also
 James Watt (disambiguation)